Caselle Landi is a comune (municipality) in the Province of Lodi in the Italian region Lombardy, located about  southeast of Milan and about  southeast of Lodi.

The name "Landi" comes from an ancient Italian noble family name: House of Landi.

Caselle Landi borders the following municipalities: Cornovecchio, Meleti, Corno Giovine, Santo Stefano Lodigiano, Castelnuovo Bocca d'Adda, Piacenza, Caorso.

References

Cities and towns in Lombardy